Lake Geneva is a lake in Douglas County, in the U.S. state of Minnesota.

The lake was named after Lake Geneva, in Switzerland.

See also
List of lakes in Minnesota

References

Lakes of Minnesota
Lakes of Douglas County, Minnesota